The following is a list of religion and spirituality podcasts.

Lists

References

Podcasts
Religion
Works about religion